Hpakant Township (also Kamaing Township) is a township of Mohnyin District in the Kachin State of Burma (Myanmar). The administrative centre is Hpakant. The major town is Kamaing.

See also
Hpakant massacre

External links
 "Kamaing Google Satellite Map" map of the administrative area with a listing of principal settlements (from Maplandia)

References

Townships of Kachin State